Kevin Bailey (born 16 March 1954) is a British poet and founder of HQ Poetry Magazine. He has had four books published and co-edited an anthology of poetry for the Acorn Book Company in 2000. He was born and grew up at Wallingford, in the County of Berkshire (now Oxfordshire), England, where he attended the local grammar school. He was later educated at the University of York and University College, Bath.

Early life

Background
In 1990 Bailey founded the international literary journal HQ Poetry Magazine, which he still edits and publishes independently. He has been closely involved in the work of London's poetry group "Piccadilly Poets" and The Live Poet's Society in Bath. In 2000 he edited (with Lucien Stryk) the classic anthology Contemporary Haiku. Since 2001 he has co-organised and judged at the annual Poetry on the Lake festival held at Orta San Giulio in Italy. In 2004 Bailey adjudicated the prestigious Sasakawa Prize for Haikai. His poetry and commentaries have appeared in a wide variety of publications. Originally trained as a psychologist he is now a self-supporting writer and lives in Swindon, Wiltshire, at the heart of his beloved North Wessex countryside.

He has served as a judge for The Silver Wyvern, the annual award of the Poetry on the Lake festival held at Lake Orta, Italy, in 2004, 2005, and 2013. A dedicated amateur astronomer, he was elected a Fellow of the Royal Astronomical Society in July, 2013. Since 2014 he has been the Uranus Coordinator for the Saturn Section of the British Astronomical Association.

Preferring publication in book form, only one of his poems "Titanic" appears on-line.

Books 
 Surviving Love (2005), Bluechrome Publishing 
 Poems and Translations (1987), Day Dream P. 
 The Acorn Book of Contemporary Haiku (2000), Acorn Book Company (ed. with Lucien Stryk). 
 Prospero's Mantle (2006), Bluechrome Publishing 
 Misericord or The Strange Poetry of Kevin Bailey (2019) Dempsey and Windle.

References 

  Accessed 27 August 2005
 Picadilly Poets - Guest Poets 27 August 2005

External links 
 "Titanic" - a poem by Kevin Bailey

1954 births
Living people
Alumni of the University of York
English male poets